The NCAA Division I Men's Swimming and Diving Championships are annual college championship events in the United States.

The meets take place in a 25-yard pool, except for the Division I meets in 2000 and 2004 which were swum in a 25-meter competition course.

Events

Individual swimming events
 
Freestyle events
50-yard Freestyle (1925−present)
100-yard Freestyle (1925−present)
200-yard Freestyle (1963−present)
500-yard Freestyle (1963−present)
1,650-yard Freestyle (1963−present)
Backstroke events
100-yard Backstroke (1950−present)
200-yard Backstroke (1951−present)
Breaststroke events
100-yard Breaststroke (1958−present)
200-yard Breaststroke (1958−present)
Butterfly events
100-yard Butterfly (1950−present)
200-yard Butterfly (1935−present)
Medley events
200-yard individual medley (1956−present)
400-yard individual medley (1963−present)

Relay swimming events
 
Freestyle relay events
200-yard freestyle relay (1927−1930, 1989−present)
400-yard freestyle relay (1931−present)
800-yard freestyle relay (1966−present)
Medley relay events
200-yard medley relay (1989−present)
400-yard medley relay (1957−present)

Diving events
Diving events
One-meter diving (1924−present)
Three-meter diving (1931−present)
Platform diving (1990−present)

Short-course events

Individual swimming events
 
Freestyle events
50-meter Freestyle (2000, 2004)
100-meter Freestyle (1924, 2000, 2004)
200-meter Freestyle (1924, 2000, 2004)
400-meter Freestyle (1924, 2000, 2004)
1,500-meter Freestyle (1924, 1932−1962, 2000, 2004)
Backstroke events
100-meter Backstroke (1924, 2000, 2004)
200-meter Backstroke (2000, 2004)
Breaststroke events
100-meter Breaststroke (2000, 2004)
200-meter Breaststroke (1924, 2000, 2004)
Butterfly events
100-meter Butterfly (2000, 2004)
200-meter Butterfly (2000, 2004)
Medley events
200-meter individual medley (2000, 2004)
400-meter individual medley (2000, 2004)

Relay swimming events
 
Freestyle relay events
200-meter freestyle relay (2000, 2004)
400-meter freestyle relay (2000, 2004)
800-meter freestyle relay (2000, 2004)
Medley relay events
200-meter medley relay (2000, 2004)
400-meter medley relay (2000, 2004)

Discontinued events

Individual swimming events
 
Freestyle events
220-yard Freestyle (1925–1962)
440-yard Freestyle (1925–1962)
Backstroke events
150-yard Backstroke (1925–1950)
Breaststroke events
100-yard Breaststroke (1957)
200-yard Breaststroke (1925–1934, 1955–1974)
Medley events
150-yard individual medley (1930, 1949–1955)

Relay swimming events
Medley relay events
300-yard medley relay (1927–1956)

Results
From inception in 1924 through 1936, three schools won all of the NCAA unofficial team championships, which were proclaimed in the newspapers of the time.

Pre-team championship (1924−1936)

Team championship (1937−present)

Team titles

Venues

Championship records

|-bgcolor=#DDDDDD
|colspan=9|
|-

|-bgcolor=#DDDDDD
|colspan=9|
|-

|-bgcolor=#DDDDDD
|colspan=9|
|-

|-bgcolor=#DDDDDD
|colspan=9|
|-

|-bgcolor=#DDDDDD
|colspan=9|
|-

|-bgcolor=#DDDDDD
|colspan=9|
|-

See also
NCAA Division I Women's Swimming and Diving Championships
NCAA Men's Division II Swimming and Diving Championships
NCAA Men's Division III Swimming and Diving Championships
NAIA Men's Swimming and Diving Championships
List of college swimming and diving teams

References

External links
 

S